Congriscus marquesaensis is an eel in the family Congridae (conger/garden eels). It was described by Emma Stanislavovna Karmovskaya in 2004. It is a marine, deep water-dwelling eel which is known from the Marquesas Islands (from which its species epithet is derived), in the eastern central Pacific Ocean. It dwells at a depth range of 391–408 metres. Males can reach a maximum total length of 27.3 centimetres.

References

Congridae
Fish described in 2004